The 1983–84 season was Newport County's fourth consecutive season in the Third Division and their 56th season overall in the Football League.

Season review

Results summary 
Note: Three points for a win

Results by round

Fixtures and results

Third Division

FA Cup

Football League Cup

Welsh Cup

League table

External links
 Newport County 1983-1984 : Results
 Newport County football club match record: 1984
 WELSH CUP 1983/84

1983-84
English football clubs 1983–84 season
Welsh football clubs 1983–84 season